Neubauer or Neubaur is a surname. Notable people with the surname include:

Adolf Neubauer, Rabbinical scholar
Alfred Neubauer, Mercedes Grand Prix racing manager
Chuck Neubauer, Pulitzer Prize-winning American journalist
Dagmar Neubauer, German athlete
Harald Neubauer, German far right politician and journalist
Jeff Neubauer, Eastern Kentucky University basketball coach
Joseph Neubauer, CEO of Aramark
Kurt Neubauer, early Nazi
Luisa Neubauer, German climate activist
Marlene Neubauer-Woerner, German sculptor
Mona Neubaur, German politician
Otto Neubauer (1874–1957), German-English biochemist
Paul Neubauer, concerto soloist and Juilliard School instructor
Peter B. Neubauer, child psychiatrist
Richard A Neubauer, U.S. physician
Trevor Neubauer, U.S. actor and model
Zdeněk Neubauer (1942–2016), philosopher and biologist

See also
Neugebauer
Bauer (disambiguation)
Neubert

German-language surnames